BASF SE is a European multinational chemical company and the largest chemical producer in the world. Its headquarters are located in Ludwigshafen, Germany.

The BASF Group comprises subsidiaries and joint ventures in more than 80 countries and operates six integrated production sites and 390 other production sites in Europe, Asia, Australia, the Americas and Africa. BASF has customers in over 190 countries and supplies products to a wide variety of industries.  Despite its size and global presence, BASF has received relatively little public attention since it abandoned the manufacture and sale of BASF-branded consumer electronics products in the 1990s.

At the end of 2019, the company employed 117,628 people, with over 54,000 in Germany. , BASF posted sales of €59.3 billion and income from operations before special items of about €4.5 billion. Between 1990 and 2005, the company invested €5.6 billion in Asia, specifically in sites near Nanjing and Shanghai in China and Mangalore in India.

BASF is listed on the Frankfurt Stock Exchange, London Stock Exchange, and Zurich Stock Exchange. The company delisted its ADR from the New York Stock Exchange in September 2007. The company is a component of the Euro Stoxx 50 stock market index.

History

It was founded by Friedrich Engelhorn on 6 April 1865 in Mannheim, in the German-speaking state of Baden. Engelhorn had been responsible for setting up a gasworks and street lighting for the town council in 1861. The gasworks produced tar as a by-product, and Engelhorn used this for the production of dyes. BASF was set up in 1865, to produce other chemicals necessary for dye production, notably soda and acids. The plant, however, was erected on the other side of the Rhine river at Ludwigshafen because the town council of Mannheim was afraid that the air pollution from the chemical plant could bother the inhabitants of the town. In 1866, the dye production processes were also moved to the BASF site.

Dyes

The discovery in 1857 by William Henry Perkin that aniline could be used to make intense colouring agents had led to the commercial production of synthetic dyes in England from aniline extracted from coal tar. BASF recruited Heinrich Caro, a German chemist with experience of the dyestuff industry in England, to be the first head of research. Caro developed a synthesis for alizarin (a natural pigment in madder), and applied for a British patent on 25 June 1869. Coincidentally, Perkin applied for a virtually identical patent on 26 June 1869, and the two companies came to a mutual commercial agreement about the process.

Further patents were granted for the synthesis of methylene blue and eosin, and in 1880, research began to try to find a synthetic process for indigo dye, though this was not successfully brought to the market until 1897. In 1901, some 80% of the BASF production was dyestuffs.

Soda

Sodium carbonate (soda) was produced by the Leblanc process until 1880, when the much cheaper Solvay process became available. BASF ceased to make its own and bought it from the Solvay company thereafter.

Sulfuric acid

Sulfuric acid was initially produced by the lead chamber process, but in 1890, a unit using the contact process was brought on stream, producing the acid at higher concentration (98% instead of 80%) and a lower cost. This development followed extensive research and development by Rudolf Knietsch, for which he received the Liebig Medal in 1904.

Ammonia
The development of the Haber process from 1908 to 1912, made it possible to synthesize ammonia (a major industrial chemical as the primary source of nitrogen), and, after acquiring exclusive rights to the process, in 1913, BASF started a new production plant in Oppau, adding fertilizers to its product range. BASF also acquired and began mining anhydrite for gypsum at the Kohnstein in 1917.

IG Farben

In 1916, BASF started operations at a new site in Leuna, where explosives were produced during the First World War. On 21 September 1921, an explosion occurred in Oppau, killing 565 people. The Oppau explosion was the biggest industrial accident in German history. Under the leadership of Carl Bosch, BASF founded IG Farben with Hoechst, Bayer, and three other companies, thus losing its independence. BASF was the nominal survivor, as all shares were exchanged for BASF shares before the merger. Rubber, fuels, and coatings were added to the range of products. In 1935, IG Farben and AEG presented the magnetophon – the first tape recorder – at the Radio Exhibition in Berlin.

World War II
After the appointment of Adolf Hitler as Chancellor in 1933, IG Farben co-operated with the National Socialist government, profiting from guaranteed volumes and prices and, in time, from slave labour provided through governmental concentration camps. BASF (leader of the chemical industry of the IG Farben) built a chemical factory in Auschwitz named "IG Auschwitz"; with a width of 3 km and length of 8 km (resulting in a size of 24 km2), it was the largest chemical factory in the world to that time. IG Farben became notorious through its production of Zyklon-B, the lethal gas used to kill prisoners in German extermination camps during the Holocaust.

The Ludwigshafen site was almost completely destroyed during the Second World War but was subsequently rebuilt. The allies dissolved IG Farben in November 1945.

Both the Ludwigshafen and Oppau plants were of strategic importance for the war because the German military needed many of their products (e.g., synthetic rubber and gasoline). As a result, they were major targets for air raids. During the war, Allied bombers attacked the plants a total of 65 times.

Bombing took place from the autumn of 1943 and saturation bombing inflicted extensive damage. Production virtually stopped by the end of 1944.

Due to a shortage of male workers during the war, women were conscripted to work in the factories, joined later by prisoners of war and foreign civilians. Concentration camp inmates did not work at the Ludwigshafen and Oppau plants.

In July 1945, the American military administration confiscated all IG Farben assets. That same year, the Allied Commission decreed that IG Farben should be dissolved. The sites at Ludwigshafen and Oppau were controlled by French authorities.

BASF refounded
On 28 July 1948, an explosion occurred at a BASF site in Ludwigshafen, killing 207 people and injuring 3818. In 1952, BASF was refounded under its name following the efforts of former Nazi Party member Carl Wurster, who served in Nazi Germany as Wehrwirtschaftsführer (war economy leader). With the German economic miracle in the 1950s, BASF added synthetics such as nylon to its product range. BASF developed Polystyrene in the 1930s and invented Styropor in 1951.

Production abroad
In the 1960s, production abroad was expanded and plants were built in Argentina, Australia, Belgium, Brazil, France, India, Italy, Japan, Mexico, Spain, United Kingdom and the United States. Following a change in corporate strategy in 1965, greater emphasis was placed on higher-value products such as coatings, pharmaceuticals, pesticides and fertilizers. Following German reunification, BASF acquired a site in Schwarzheide, Eastern Germany, on 25 October 1990. It expanded to Podolsk, Russia, in 2012, and to Kazan in 2013.

The company announced the start of a US$10 billion investment project at Zhanjiang, China, in November 2019. This ″Verbund″ site is intended for the production of engineering plastics and TPU. The site would be the third-largest BASF site worldwide, following Ludwigshafen, Germany, and Antwerp, Belgium, and is expected to be operational by 2022.

Takeovers
In 1968, BASF (together with Bayer AG) bought the German coatings company Herbol. BASF completely took over the Herbol branches in Cologne and Würzburg in 1970. Under new management, the renewal and expansion of the trademark continued. After an extensive reorganisation and an increasing international orientation of the coatings business, Herbol became part of the new founded Deco GmbH in 1997.

BASF bought the Wyandotte Chemical Company, and its Geismar, Louisiana chemical plant in the early 1970s. The plant produced plastics, herbicides, and antifreeze. BASF soon tried to operate union-free, having already reduced or eliminated union membership in several other US plants. Challenging the Geismar OCAW union resulted in a labor dispute that saw members locked out from 1984 to 1989, and eventually winning their case. A worker solidarity committee at BASF's headquarters plant in Ludwigshafen, Germany, took donations from German workers to support the American strikers and organized rallies and publicity in support. The dispute was the subject of an academic study. The union also exposed major accidental releases of phosgene, toluene and other toxic gases, these being publicized in the local media and through a video, Out of Control. A court threw out a $66,700 fine against BASF for five environmental violations as "too small".

BASF's European coatings business was taken over by AkzoNobel in 1999. BASF bought the Engelhard Corporation for $4.8 billion in 2006. Other acquisitions in 2006, were the purchase of Johnson Polymer and the construction chemicals business of Degussa.

The acquisition of Johnson Polymer was completed on 1 July 2006. The purchase price was $470 million on a cash and debt-free basis. It provided BASF with a range of water-based resins that complements its portfolio of high solids and UV resins for the coatings and paints industry and strengthened the company's market presence, particularly in North America.

The acquisition of Degussa AG's construction chemicals business was completed in 2006. The purchase price for equity was about €2.2 billion. In addition, the transaction was associated with a debt of €500 million.

The company agreed to acquire Ciba (formerly part of Ciba-Geigy) in September 2008. The proposed deal was reviewed by the European Commissioner for Competition. On 9 April 2009, the acquisition was officially completed.

On 19 December 2008, BASF acquired U.S.-based Whitmire Micro-Gen together with U.K.-based Sorex Ltd, Widnes, Great Britain. Sorex is a manufacturer of branded chemical and non-chemical products for professional pest management. In March 2007 Sorex was put up for sale with a price tag of about £100 million.

In December 2010, BASF completed the acquisition of Cognis.

In May 2015, BASF agreed to sell parts of its pharmaceutical ingredients business to Swiss drug manufacturer Siegfried Holding for a fee of €270 million, including assumed debt.

In October 2017, BASF announced it would buy seed and herbicide businesses from Bayer for €5.9 billion ($7 billion), as part of its acquisition of Monsanto.

In August 2019, BASF agreed to sell its global pigments business to Japanese fine chemical company DIC for €1.15 billion ($1.28 billion) on a cash and debt-free basis.

In September 2019, BASF signed an agreement with DuPont Safety & Construction, a subsidiary business unit of DuPont Co., to sell its ultrafiltration membrane business, Inge GmbH. According to BASF executives, Inge GmbH and its products fit better with DuPont and their business strategy.

In 2023, BASF announced that the company is planning to close one of its two ammonia factories at its site in Ludwigshafen, this comes as part of the companies plans to cut costs as the organisation has struggled with high energy costs. The result of the organisations plans will lead to increased production in China while resulting in the loss of 2,600 jobs.

Dicamba lawsuit
On 27 January 2020, the first-ever lawsuit concerning Dicamba-related products began in Cape Girardeau, Missouri. The lawsuit involves a peach farmer who alleged that Dicamba-based herbicides caused significant damage to his crops and trees. It had also been filed in November 2016, when Dicamba was still owned by Monsanto. On 14 February 2020, the jury involved in the lawsuit ruled against BASF its co-defendant Bayer, which had acquired Monsanto and its products, and found in favor of the peach grower, Bader Farms owner Bill Bader. BASF and Bayer were also ordered to pay Bader $15 million in damages. On 15 February 2020, Monsanto and BASF were ordered to pay an additional $250 million in punitive damages.

Finances 
For the fiscal year 2017, BASF reported earnings of EUR€6.1 billion, with an annual revenue of EUR€64.5 billion, an increase of 12% over the previous fiscal cycle. BASF's shares traded at over €69 per share, and its market capitalization was valued at US€63.7 billion in November 2018. In October 2019, BASF reported a drop of operating income for July to September amounting to 24 percent, along with a drop in EBIT earnings of €1.1 billion ($1.2 billion). The US-China trade war as well as uncertainties related to Brexit were identified as contributing factors. However, overall third quarter profit beat expectations as the acquisition of Bayer AG's agrochemical and seed business help to offset some of the effects of the trade war.

Business segments

BASF operates in a variety of markets. Its business is organized in the segments of Chemicals, Plastics, Performance Products, Functional Solutions, Agricultural Solutions, and Oil and Gas.

Chemicals
BASF produces a wide range of chemicals such as solvents, amines, resins, glues, electronic-grade chemicals, industrial gases, basic petrochemicals, and inorganic chemicals (such as Z-Cote). The most important customers for this segment are the pharmaceutical, construction, textile, and automotive industries.

Plastics
BASF's plastic products include high-performance materials in thermoplastics, foams, and urethanes.

Engineering PlasticsBASF's Engineering Plastics consists of the "4 Ultras" – Ultramid polyamide (PA) nylon-based resins, Ultradur, polybutylene terephthalate (PBT), Ultraform, polyacetal (POM), and Ultrason, polysulfone (PSU) and polyethersulfone (PES).

StyrenicsBASF Styrenics consists of the Foams and Copolymers. BASF's styrenic copolymers have applications in electronics, building and construction, and automotive components. In 2011 BASF and INEOS blended their global business activities in the fields of styrene monomers (SM), polystyrene (PS), acrylonitrile butadiene styrene (ABS), styrene butadiene copolymers (SBC) and other styrene-based copolymers (SAN, AMSAN, ASA, MABS) into a joint venture named Styrolution.

PolyurethanesBASF's Polyurethanes business consists of diverse technologies and finished products. Urethane chemicals are raw materials used in rigid and flexible foams commonly used for insulation in the construction and appliance industries, furniture, packaging, and transportation.

FoamsFoams like Styropor are generally used as insulating materials. They are eco-efficient and offer advantages over other materials in terms of cost-effectiveness, preservation of resources and environmental protection. Investments made for insulating materials usually pay for themselves within a short time and contribute to retaining and even enhancing the value of buildings.

Polyamides and IntermediatesBASF manufactures polyamide precursors and polyamide.

Biodegradable plasticsBASF developed a biodegradable plastic with a high content of polylactic acid.

Performance products
BASF produces a range of performance chemicals, coatings and functional polymers. These include raw materials for detergents, textile and leather chemicals, pigments and raw materials for adhesives, paper chemicals. Customers are the automotive, oil, paper, packaging, textile, sanitary products, detergents, construction materials, coatings, printing, and leather industries.

Functional Solutions

BASF's Functional Solutions segment consists of the Catalysts, Construction Chemicals and Coatings divisions. These divisions develop customer-specific products, in particular for the automotive and construction industries.

Agricultural
BASF supplies agricultural products and chemicals including fungicides, herbicides, insecticides and seed treatment products. The company also researches nutrigenomics. BASF opened a new crop protection technology center in Limburgerhof, Germany in 2016.

Biotechnology
BASF was cooperating with Monsanto Company in research, development and marketing of biotechnology. In correlation to this work, BASF has licensed many gene editing tools including CRISPR Cas9 and CRISPR Cas12a (Cpf1).

The BASF Plant Science subsidiary produces the Amflora and Starch Potato genetically modified potato with reduced amylose. In 2010 BASF conducted Department of Environment, Food and Rural Affairs approved trials of genetically modified potatoes in the United Kingdom. Starch Potato was authorised for use in the USA in 2014.

Other GM crops are Phytaseed Canola varieties with phytase, sulfonylurea herbicide tolerant soybean and drought tolerant corn (with cold shock protein B) developed with Monsanto.

Oil and gas
BASF explores for and produces oil and gas through its subsidiary Wintershall Dea. In Central and Eastern Europe, Wintershall works with its Russian partner Gazprom.

Investors
75% of the BASF shares are held by institutional investors (BlackRock more than 5%). 36% of the shares are held in Germany, 11% in the UK and 17% in the U.S.

Production
BASF's recent success is characterized by a focus on creating resource efficient product lines after completely abandoning consumer products. This strategy was reflected in production by a re-focus towards integrated production sites. The largest such integrated production site is located in Ludwigshafen employing 33,000 people.

Integrated production sites are characterized by co-location of many individual production lines (producing a specific chemical), which share an interconnected material flow. Piping is used ubiquitously for volume materials. All production lines use common raw material sourcing and feed back waste resources, which can be used elsewhere (e.g. steam of various temperatures, sulfuric acid, carbon monoxide). The economic incentive for this approach is high resource and energy efficiency of the overall process, reduced shipping cost and associated reduced risk of accidents. Due to the high cost of such an integrated production site, it establishes a high entry barrier for competitors trying to enter the market for volume chemicals.

BASF built a new chemical complex in Dahej, Gujarat at a cost of $100 million. This facility has South Asia's first methylene diphenyl diisocyanate (MDI) splitter for processing crude MDI. BASF has 8 production facilities in India.

BASF SE has succeeded in developing a semi-crystalline polyamide that allows light to pass through largely unhindered. Ultramid Vision combines very high light transmission with low light scattering. This makes it the world's first semi-crystalline polyamide for semi-transparent or transparent components in chemically challenging environments. Additionally, the unique polyamide is UV and temperature resistant, scratch-proof as well as suitable for flame-retardant requirements. Ultramid Vision can be used in various application fields: It recommends itself especially for parts for visual check, illumination or light design. Ultramid Vision presents a versatile alternative to commonly used materials such as amorphous aliphatic polyamides, polycarbonate or styrene-acrylonitrile copolymers.

Environmental record
According to the 2020 "Top 100 Polluters Indexes" published by the University of Massachusetts, Amherst's "Political Economy Research Institute" (PERI), among US corporations, BASF was ranked the #2 largest polluter of water and #4 largest polluter of air in 2018, the most recent year for which data is available from the U.S. Environmental Protection Agency.

In 2006, BASF was included in the Climate Leadership Index for their efforts in relation to climate change and greenhouse gas emissions.

BASF has created filters for wastewater treatment plants that help to reduce emissions.

The BASF Company and Columbia University formed a partnership to further research "environmentally benign and sustainable energy sources". The company has recently reported their emissions in 2006 to be "1.50 million metric tons of waste," which is a decrease from previous years. The amount of waste BASF produces has continued to fall.

While BASF publishes its environmental information in the US and Europe, Greenpeace has expressed deep concerns at BASF's refusal to release environmental information on its operations in China.

In May 2009, a BASF Plant in Hannibal, Missouri, United States, accidentally discharged chromium into the Mississippi River. The local Department of Natural Resources performed tests in December 2009 showing the chromium levels did not exceed regulatory safety limits. BASF worked with the Missouri Department of Natural Resources (MoDNR) to resolve questions regarding the elevated level of hexavalent chromium that was detected in the effluent from one of its permitted outfalls into the Mississippi River. The state department of health reviewed the test results and determined that the amounts found were well below recommended public health screening levels.

In 2013, BASF reported a spill of several hundred kilogrammes of the chelating agent Trilon-B (tetrasodium Edta) into the river Rhine from BASF's headquarters in Ludwigshafen, Germany.

See also 

 Dow Chemical Company
 Union Carbide
 Sculpteo

References

Further reading

 Beer, John J. The Emergence of the German Dye Industry (1959).

External links

 
 

 
Chemical companies of Germany
Chemical companies established in 1865
IG Farben
German brands
The Holocaust
Companies based in Rhineland-Palatinate
Paint manufacturers
Multinational companies headquartered in Germany
Electronics companies of Germany
Companies in the Euro Stoxx 50
Companies listed on the Bombay Stock Exchange
Companies listed on the Frankfurt Stock Exchange
Companies involved in the Holocaust
Engelhorn family